Jovan Đokić (also transliterated Jovan Djokić; born 13 August 1992) is a Serbian football midfielder who plays for Navbahor.

Career
On 21 January 2017, Đokić signed for Kazakhstan Premier League side FC Atyrau.

International career
Đokić was called by coach Slavoljub Muslin in the Serbia national football team in January 2017. On 29 January 2017, Đokić made his international debut for the Serbia national football team in a friendly match against United States in a 0–0 away draw in San Diego.

References

External links
 
 
 
 
 Jovan Đokić at Utakmica.rs 

1992 births
Living people
Association football midfielders
Serbian footballers
Serbian expatriate footballers
FK Javor Ivanjica players
FK Rudar Kostolac players
FC Atyrau players
FC AGMK players
PFC Lokomotiv Tashkent players
Serbian First League players
Serbian SuperLiga players
Kazakhstan Premier League players
Uzbekistan Super League players
Serbia international footballers
Serbian expatriate sportspeople in Kazakhstan
Serbian expatriate sportspeople in Uzbekistan
Expatriate footballers in Kazakhstan
Expatriate footballers in Uzbekistan